Archimede was the lead ship of her class of four submarines built for the  (Royal Italian Navy) during the early 1930s.

Design and description
The Archimede class was an improved and enlarged version of the earlier . They displaced  surfaced and  submerged. They had an operational diving depth of  Their crew numbered 55 officers and enlisted men.

For surface running, the boats were powered by two  diesel engines, each driving one propeller shaft. When submerged each propeller was driven by a  electric motor. They could reach  on the surface and  underwater.

The boats were armed with eight  torpedo tubes, four each in the bow and in the stern for which they carried a total of 16 torpedoes. They were also armed with a pair of  deck guns, one each fore and aft of the conning tower, for combat on the surface. Their anti-aircraft armament consisted of two single  machine guns.

Construction and career
Archimede was laid down by Cantieri navali Tosi di Taranto at their Taranto shipyard in 1931, launched on 10 December 1933 and completed the following year. She was transferred to the Spanish Nationalist Navy in April 1937 and renamed General Sanjurjo.

Notes

Bibliography

External links
 Archimede Marina Militare website

Archimede-class submarines
World War II submarines of Italy
1933 ships
Ships built by Cantieri navali Tosi di Taranto
Ships built in Taranto
Italy–Spain military relations
Submarines of the Spanish Navy